GamesBids.com launched July 27, 1998 as Torontosummergames.com, and was published to follow the bid by the city of Toronto to organize the Games of the XXIXth Olympiad in 2008. After Beijing was eventually elected to host the Olympic Games, the site continued to operate, generally addressing and analysing the overall Olympic bid business.  Having launched in 1998, GamesBids.com was on the leading edge of publishing original news online. The site has been the source of some key exclusives including the leaking of the official Beijing 2008 Olympic Games logo and providing information before it was due to be released to the public.  The logo was leaked ahead of a planned unveiling of the coveted brand that had been delayed by the SARS epidemic, and the website received international criticism for the publication.

Many international websites, newspapers, and news stations have mentioned Gamesbids in connection to the Olympic Movement, for instance the International Herald Tribune  and The New York Times that wrote "GamesBids.com, an influential, independent Web site based in Canada that looks at the business of the bidding process."

As an English-language publication, GamesBids.com is frequently referenced as a key source by mainstream and specialty media across the United States and Canada and was particularly influential during campaigns by Chicago to host the 2016 Games and New York to host in 2012. In 2020, GamesBids.com created headlines across India when it received official clarification from the International Olympic Committee that India remained in the running for the 2032 Olympics after the IOC Vice President said the nation was out of the running.

GamesBids.com is also well-respected by key industry insiders.  Baku 2020 Olympic bid chief Konul Nurullayeva said "GamesBids is one of the most influential websites that disseminate information about the preparation for the Olympics, the election process and the candidate-cities."

Olympics critic, activist and author Helen Jefferson Lenskyj wrote that GamesBids.com is "a good source for bid committees but of limited use to critics" in her book . GamesBids.com however regularly covers Olympic Games and events live and on-site and is used as a source for other publications that are not on the scene.  In 2015 GamesBids.com provided exclusive coverage of the Tibetan protests of the Beijing 2022 Olympic Games bid in Lausanne The website is referenced by Olympic authors and textbooks.

In 2010 GamesBids.com became one of the first web-only publications to receive official Olympic Games accreditation, to cover the Vancouver 2010 Olympic Winter Games.  Such access had only been typically granted to print or broadcast media outlets.  In 2013 GamesBids.com was given a rare accreditation to report from Turkmenistan, a country that does not issue journalist visas   GamesBids.com has interviewed many prominent figures connected with sport, politics and royalty.  In 2019 the website had a rare exclusive interview with Princess Victoria and Prince Daniel of Sweden during the Stockholm 2026 Olympic bid campaign.

Awards and nominations
In 2015, GamesBids.com was nominated for an inaugural International Sports Press Association Sport Media Pearl Award in the category of "Journalistic Weblog". In 2018, GamesBids.com was ranked first in North and South America.

BidIndex
The site publishes and regularly updates the BidIndex, an Olympic bid rating system in which the relative strength of the different bids and their chances of succeeding is measured. The BidIndex was correct when it predicted Beijing, though wrong with Vancouver, London and Sochi. The prediction model is further enhanced after each bid. BidIndex has accurately predicted the last four elected host cities, including Rio de Janeiro for the 2016 Summer Olympics, Pyeongchang for the 2018 Winter Olympics, Tokyo for the 2020 Summer Olympics and Beijing for the 2022 Winter Olympics.

2022 BidIndex
BidIndex for the 2022 Winter Olympics, which normally is issued during the early days of the application phase, have been delayed due to the volatility of the field of contestants. It was eventually announced on 21 July 2015, ten days before the host city election.

BidIndex History
Cities are sorted by final BidIndex score for each Games. Only cities who progressed to the voting stage are shown. The final BidIndex scores are published before the election night, and therefore does not take into account factors such as the quality of each candidate city's final presentations.

Past Olympic Host Election Results
GamesBids has curated and publishes a comprehensive list of past Olympic Host election results that documents bid cities, IOC Sessions, locations and dates of elections, round-by-round vote counts and other notes for all past Olympic Games, Olympic Winter Games and Youth Olympic Games.  This information is not compiled elsewhere, including on the International Olympic Committee website.

Founding
GamesBids.com was founded in 1998  as an Olympic bid news and information web site created in Toronto, Ontario, Canada, by Robert Livingstone.

References

External links
 GamesBids.com
 GamesBids.com Forum

Olympic Games bids
Canadian news websites
1998 establishments in Canada